Tricholita chipeta is a species of cutworm or dart moth in the family Noctuidae. It was first described by William Barnes in 1904 and it is found in North America.

The MONA or Hodges number for Tricholita chipeta is 10631.

References

Further reading

 
 
 
 
 

Eriopygini